Dusman Ke Khoon Paani Ha is a Bhojpuri action movie of Bhojiwood starring Dharmendra, Ravi Kishan & Armaan Kohli , directed and produced by Suresh K. Grover. This film was released on 19 September 2014 in the banner of Divine Grovers.

Cast 
Dharmendra
Ravi Kishan
Puneet Issar
Tinnu Anand
Armaan Kohli
Avinash Wadhawan

References

External links 
 

2014 films
Indian action films
2014 action films